Morokro is a town in southern Ivory Coast. It is a sub-prefecture of Tiassalé Department in Agnéby-Tiassa Region, Lagunes District.

Morokro was a commune until March 2012, when it became one of 1126 communes nationwide that were abolished.

In 2021, the population of the sub-prefecture of Morokro was 55,636.

Villages
The 15 villages of the sub-prefecture of Morokro and their population in 2014 are:

Notes

Sub-prefectures of Agnéby-Tiassa
Former communes of Ivory Coast